The enzyme xylono-1,4-lactonase (EC 3.1.1.68) catalyzes the reaction

D-xylono-1,4-lactone + H2O  D-xylonate

This enzyme belongs to the family of hydrolases, specifically those acting on carboxylic ester bonds.  The systematic name of this enzyme class is D-xylono-1,4-lactone lactonohydrolase. Other names in common use include xylono-γ-lactonase, and xylonolactonase.  This enzyme participates in pentose and glucuronate interconversions.

References

 

EC 3.1.1
Enzymes of unknown structure